The buff-winged cinclodes (Cinclodes fuscus) is a species of bird in the family Furnariidae. It is found in Argentina and eastern Chile; it winters in the Pampas.  It was formerly considered the nominate subspecies of the bar-winged cinclodes.

Its natural habitats are subtropical or tropical high-altitude shrubland, temperate grassland, and subtropical or tropical high-altitude grassland.

References

buff-winged cinclodes
Birds of Argentina
buff-winged cinclodes
Taxa named by Louis Jean Pierre Vieillot
Taxonomy articles created by Polbot